Calidoscopio (foaled September 10, 2003) is a retired Argentinean racehorse who is best known for his victories in the Breeders' Cup Marathon, and the Brooklyn Handicap.

Racing Style 
Calidoscopio's racing style is the main reason for his popularity as he is well known as being one of the best deep closers in modern racing. Not in the same way as other famous closers horses like Zenyatta or Street Sense as Calidoscopio tends to be a little beyond that. Rather than just trailing the field Calidoscopio has gone as far as to disconnect himself from the rest of the field. In the Breeders Cup Marathon and Brooklyn Handicap, he was so far back that he either was on the far right of the wide camera or just out of view. Very akin to Silky Sullivan he is one of the few other horses who made a name for himself with this extreme tactic, the major difference is Calidoscopio ran his best races at longer distances of 1 1/4-1 3/4 miles while Silky Sullivan was  more of a middle-distance horse.

Career

Argentine career 
Calidoscopio was foaled in Argentina. He is by Luhuk and out of Calderona, a daughter of Lefty. He was bred by Haras La Quebrada and during his racing career was owned by Dona Pancha Stud. His trainer in Argentina was Guillermo Frenkel Santillan. He didn't make his first start until he was four-years-old, later than most horses. He would rise through the ranks rather quickly breaking his maiden in his second start. He then went on to win his first Graded stakes race, the Grade 2 Clásico Chacabuco. It wouldn't come easy as he had to fight Ibope in a stretch duel prevailing in the last few strides by a neck. This would be the first of seven graded stakes races that he would win in Argentina. He concluded his first year of racing with a first of two wins in the Clásico Ayacucho. He would not win another race until his six-year-old season where he had his biggest in the Grade 1 Republica Argentina in 2009 although he didn't cross the wire first. The initial victor was Mestre who closed from the back with Calidoscopio but Mestre cut off Calidoscopio in the stretch causing him to check up. Calidoscopio regrouped and flew late again but missed by a neck. The interference in the stretch led to Mestre getting disqualified and placed second behind Calidoscopio. It was the only time Calidoscopio would win a Grade 1 race. He overcame mild interference again in his next victory, the Grade 2 Clásico General Pueyrredon, as he had to navigate between multiple horses from the back. But after he was clear in second place, the leader Best Guest veered from the outside to the rail and Calidoscopio made a small check-up. He then moved to Best Guest's outside, running him down and winning by half a length. He would race on until the age of nine in Argentina, at that point he was running significantly less only having three starts that year in Argentina. But two of them were wins, his first win was in the Clásico Vicente Dupay where he made a huge move from the far outside more than ten lengths back catching the runaway leader Fuerte Senal to win by a length. Sandwiched between his two wins was an unimpressive ninth in the Republica Argentina. But less than two months later he ran his final race in Argentina, the Grade 2 Clásico General Belgrano where in a similar fashion he showed off his late speed going to the far outside and winning with a length to spare.

American career 
With his win in the General Belgrano, he then was sent to America for his next race, the Breeders Cup Marathon, a Grade II race. Calidoscopio didn't race for five months as he prepared for the biggest race of his career. One of the most major changes going into the Breeders Cup was a change of jockey from regular rider Pablo Falero to American jockey Aaron Gryder. To get to know Calidoscopio better Aaron watched DVDs of Calidoscopio's wins in Argentina.[1] Aaron had befriended the trainers of Calidoscopio when they were in America and soon earned the mount. Initially, the horse proved a little tricky for Aaron, stopping and looking around and not being eager to get into his breeze. But Aaron soon warmed up to him saying the initial difficulty was "because he was smarter than I was." Aaron was rather confident going into the race saying multiple times in the days leading up that he was going to win. He was instructed to detach himself from the rest of the field and let him settle. That would be exactly what happened as Calidoscopio dropped as far back as 20 1/4[2] lengths behind the leaders as Belmont Stakes shower and favorite, Atigun, was in the lead. Both Sense Of Purpose and Fame And Glory would pull up out of the race as Calidoscopio slowly began to accelerate down the backstretch for the second time. He went to the outside and swept by the two leaders Atigun and Grassy and even after being 20 lengths behind the leaders at one point he still had time to open up 4 and 1/4 lengths on Grassy and win the race. This was historic as he was both the oldest horse and the first Argentinean horse to win a Breeders Cup race.

He would return for two more starts at the ripe old age of ten. The first of these two starts was the Tokyo City Cup Stakes a race he was nearly scratched from due to cutting one of his front hooves. He would stay closer to the pace only 11 and 1/2 lengths behind the leaders at worst. But he didn't kick on the same way he did in the Breeders Cup and finished fifth. Aaron later said that he "wasn't 100%" describing the race as one he needed but not one he was 100% in. He rested up to the Brooklyn Handicap which is where he would give another race more akin to the Marathon. His main competition was Percussion who would lead the race from nearly start to finish and Ruler On Ice, the winner of the Belmont Stakes two years earlier. This race favored Ruler On Ice as it was the same distance and sloppy conditions as the Belmont. Even with these circumstances, Ruler On Ice proved not a factor as Percussion set the pace alone. Calidoscopio disconnected from the field once more, falling 22 whole lengths behind. He was far enough back that the cameras even had trouble showing him but just as before in the Breeders Cup Marathon, Calidoscopio rallied. After going widest into the far turn to prevent halting the momentum, Calidoscopio continued to run on the outside ultimately passing everyone. At the end of the final stretch he ran down Percussion who had a three-length lead at the top of the stretch. He even had enough time to open up a length of his own as he crossed the wire the winner Brooklyn Handicap as a 10-year-old. Just the same as in the Breeders Cup Marathon, his win was historical as he became the oldest winner of the Brooklyn beating out the previous holder Borrow by a year. He also became the second 10-year-old horse to win a graded stakes race in North America (the first one being Musketier) and the only 10-year-old to win a graded stakes race in America. With that historic win, Calidoscopio was retired, not due to his age but to a relatively minor tendon injury. His race record concluded with 42:11-5-8, with total race earnings just under a million dollars, at $975,154. He currently stands at stud in Argentina at Haras La Quebrada.

References 

Argentine racehorses
2003 racehorse births
Racehorses bred in Argentina
Breeders' Cup Marathon winners